Zámrsk is a municipality and village in Ústí nad Orlicí District in the Pardubice Region of the Czech Republic. It has about 700 inhabitants.

Administrative parts
Villages of Janovičky and Nová Ves are administrative parts of Zámrsk.

References

Villages in Ústí nad Orlicí District